Vlokia  is a genus of flowering plants in the family Aizoaceae. The first description of the genus (along with the species Vlokia ater) was published in 1994 by Steven A. Hammer. The generic name honors the discoverer of Vlokia ater, South African botanist Jan H. J. Vlok (born 1957). The pronunciation "Flow-key-a" has been recommended based on the pronunciation of his name.

Species
Vlokia ater
Vlokia montana

References

Aizoaceae
Aizoaceae genera